Carex pellita is a species of sedge known by the common name woolly sedge.

Distribution
This sedge is native to much of North America, including southern Canada, the United States, and northeastern Mexico.

Description
Carex pellita grows in wet and dry areas in a number of habitat types, including disturbed areas such as ditches and roadsides. This sedge grows in colonies of individuals made up of clumps of stems 30 centimeters to one meter-3 feet tall from a network of spreading rhizomes.

The inflorescence is up to 30 centimeters long, a cylindrical body of overlapping flowers. Female flowers have dark brown or purplish, hairy scales with long tips. The fruit is coated in a fuzzy to woolly perigynium.

External links
Jepson Manual Treatment - Carex pellita
USDA Plants Profile: Carex pellita
Flora of North America
Carex pellita - Photo gallery
Profile: Woolly Sedge (Carex pellita) Photos, Drawings, Text. (Wild Plants of Winnipeg from Nature Manitoba)

pellita
Flora of North America
Plants described in 1805
Taxa named by Gotthilf Heinrich Ernst Muhlenberg